Centaurea species (knapweeds, starthistles and relatives) are used as food plants by the caterpillars of a numerous Lepidoptera species, including:

Monophagous
Species which feed exclusively on Centaurea. Some are used in biological control of knapweeds that have become invasive weeds.

Bucculatricidae
 Bucculatrix centaureae – only on C. triniifolia
Cochylidae
 Sulphur knapweed moth (Agapeta zoegana) – recorded on diffuse knapweed (C. diffusa), spotted knapweed (C. maculosa) and others
Coleophoridae
 Coleophora didymella – only on greater knapweed (C. scabiosa)
Gelechiidae
 Spotted knapweed seedhead moth (Metzneria paucipunctella) – recorded on spotted knapweed (C. maculosa) and others

Polyphagous
Species which feed on Centaurea and other plants

Coleophoridae
 Several Coleophora case-bearer species:
 C. alcyonipennella
 C. brevipalpella
 C. conspicuella
 C. frischella
 C. paripennella
Crambidae
 Dolicharthria punctalis
 Paratalanta hyalinalis – recorded on brown knapweed (C. jacea)
 Sitochroa verticalis – recorded on brown knapweed (C. jacea)
Geometridae
 Common pug (Eupithecia vulgata) – recorded on brown knapweed (C. jacea) and perhaps others
 Engrailed (Ectropis crepuscularia)
 Grey pug (Eupithecia subfuscata) – recorded on brown knapweed (C. jacea) and perhaps others
 Lime-speck pug (Eupithecia centaureata)
Noctuidae
 Marbled clover (Heliothis viriplaca)
 Hebrew character (Orthosia gothica) – recorded on wig knapweed (C. phrygia) and perhaps others
 Comma (Polygonia c-album)
Nymphalidae
 Spotted fritillary (Melitaea didyma) – recorded on brown knapweed (C. jacea) and perhaps others
 Knapweed fritillary (Melitaea phoebe) – recorded on brown knapweed (C. jacea) and others
Oecophoridae
 Agonopterix arenella

External links 

Centaurea
+Lepidoptera